Avrom Smith (born March 13, 1972) is a retired American football player. Smith played college football as a running back for the University of New Hampshire and went on to play professionally for the London Monarchs of NFL Europe.

References

1972 births
Living people
American football running backs
London Monarchs players
New Hampshire Wildcats football players